Abaturovo is the name of several rural localities in Russia:
Abaturovo, Arkhangelsk Oblast, a village in Moshinsky Settlement of Nyandomsky District in Arkhangelsk Oblast; 
Abaturovo, Nizhny Novgorod Oblast, a village in Rabotkinsky Selsoviet of Kstovsky District in Nizhny Novgorod Oblast; 
Abaturovo, Tver Oblast, a village in Malovasilevskoye Rural Settlement of Kimrsky District in Tver Oblast; 
Abaturovo, Vologda Oblast, a village in Krasnopolyansky Selsoviet of Nikolsky District in Vologda Oblast
Abaturovo, Yaroslavl Oblast, a village in Klementyevsky Rural Okrug of Uglichsky District in Yaroslavl Oblast;